Inni Aboubacar (born 1948) is a Nigerien long-distance runner. He competed in the men's marathon at the 1988 Summer Olympics.

References

External links

1948 births
Living people
Athletes (track and field) at the 1988 Summer Olympics
Nigerien male long-distance runners
Nigerien male marathon runners
Olympic athletes of Niger
Place of birth missing (living people)